Tun Syed Nasir bin Syed Ismail (
7 March 1921– 16 March 1982) was a Speaker of the Dewan Rakyat, the lower house of the Parliament of Malaysia. During his lifetime, he was known as a nationalist who sought to fight for the primacy of the national language in Malaysia as a means to create a national identity through the closing down of public-funded Mandarin and Tamil vernacular schools. Tun Syed Nasir sees a common education system for all as a solution to this dilemma. A prominent politician from the United Malays National Organisation (UMNO) – the leading party of the governing Barisan Nasional coalition – he served as the 5th Speaker of the Dewan Rakyat from 1978 till his death in 1982.

He was born in Batu Pahat, Johor, Malaysia, and is of Hadhrami Arab descent.

Awards and recognitions

Honours of Malaysia
  : 
  Companion of the Order of the Defender of the Realm (JMN) (1961)
  : 
  Recipient of the Malaysian Commemorative Medal (Silver) (PPM) (1965)
  Commander of the Order of the Defender of the Realm (PMN) – Tan Sri (1971)
  Grand Commander of the Order of Loyalty to the Crown of Malaysia (SSM) – Tun (1982)
  :
  Recipient of the Star of Sultan Ismail (BSI)
  Recipient of the Sultan Ibrahim Medal (PIS)
  Knight Grand Companion of the Order of Loyalty of Sultan Ismail of Johor (SSIJ) – Dato'
  Knight Grand Commander of the Order of the Crown of Johor (SPMJ) – Dato'
  :
  Grand Knight of the Order of the Crown of Pahang (SIMP) – formerly Dato', now Dato' Indera (1980)
  :
  Knight Commander of the Order of the Crown of Perlis (DPMP) – Dato'

Places named after him
Several places were named after him, including:
 Kolej Tun Syed Nasir, a residential college at Universiti Kebangsaan Malaysia, Bangi, Selangor
 Kolej Tun Syed Nasir, a residential college at Universiti Tun Hussein Onn Malaysia, Batu Pahat, Johor
 Politeknik Tun Syed Nasir Syed Ismail in Muar, Johor
 Taman Tun Syed Nasir, a residential area in Muar, Johor
 Kampung Kenangan Tun Syed Nasir in Muar, Johor
 Sekolah Menengah Kebangsaan Tun Syed Nasir Ismail , Johor Bahru (SMKTSNI)

References

1921 births
1982 deaths
Speakers of the Dewan Rakyat
Malaysian people of Yemeni descent
People from Batu Pahat
Hadhrami people
People from Johor
Malaysian people of Malay descent
Malaysian Muslims
United Malays National Organisation politicians
Grand Commanders of the Order of Loyalty to the Crown of Malaysia
Commanders of the Order of the Defender of the Realm
Companions of the Order of the Defender of the Realm
Knights Grand Commander of the Order of the Crown of Johor